The Atlanta FaZe is an American professional Call of Duty League (CDL) esports team based in Atlanta, Georgia. Atlanta FaZe is a partnership between FaZe Clan and Atlanta Esports Ventures. Atlanta was announced as one of the first five cities to host a CDL team.

History 

On May 2, 2019, Activision Blizzard announced that Atlanta Esports Ventures had purchased one of the first five franchise slots for the Call of Duty League. According to ESPN, the publisher was looking to sell slots for approximately $25 million per team. "We have the opportunity to — once again — play a pivotal role in Atlanta's diverse esports community by bringing the future of Call of Duty esports to the city," said Hamilton in a release at the time.

The team, which is a partnership between Atlanta Esports Ventures and FaZe Clan, was announced in October 2019 as one of the first twelve franchises to compete in the inaugural COD League. Atlanta FaZe was the second Atlanta based team investment after Atlanta Reign from the Overwatch League, and is the third region-based team for FaZe. Atlanta announced its inaugural season roster the same month. As the league was modeled on the region-based format of traditional sports teams and the Overwatch League, all players were based in the Atlanta area. The team's coach is James “Crowder” Crowder, known for winning the Call of Duty Championship 2015 as a member of Denial Esports.

The team won the Atlanta Home Series in February 2020, followed by a win in the Florida Home Series in May, making them the second team after Dallas Empire to win two tournaments. In May 2020, Atlanta FaZe became the team with the highest standing in the COD League.

Current roster

References

External links
 

Call of Duty League teams
Esports teams based in the United States
Esports teams established in 2019
FaZe Clan
Organizations based in Atlanta
Venture capital-funded esports teams